Gnant is a surname. Notable people with the surname include:

 Jody Marie Gnant (born 1981), American singer-songwriter and pianist
 Randall Gnant (born 1945), American politician

See also
 Gant (surname)